James Noxon (March 17, 1818 in Onondaga Hill, Onondaga County, New York – January 6, 1881 in Syracuse, Onondaga Co., NY) was an American lawyer and politician from New York.

Life
He was the son of Bartholomew Davis Noxon (1788–1869) and Sally Ann (Van Kleeck) Noxon (1793–1874). He attended Hamilton College from 1834 to 1836, and graduated from Union College in 1838. Then he studied law, was admitted to the bar in 1841, and practiced law in Syracuse, joining his father's firm of Noxon, Leavenworth & Comstock. On September 6, 1842, he married Elizabeth Rebecca Cadwell (1820–1859), and they had four children.

He was a member of the New York State Senate (22nd D.) from 1856 to 1859, sitting in the 79th, 80th, 81st and 82nd New York State Legislatures.

On October 2, 1860, me married Sarah Matilda Wright (1838–1922), and they had six children. He was a justice of the New York Supreme Court (5th D.) from 1876 until his death. He was buried at the Oakwood Cemetery in Syracuse.

Sources
The New York Civil List compiled by Franklin Benjamin Hough, Stephen C. Hutchins and Edgar Albert Werner (1867; pg. 441f)
Biographical Sketches of the State Officers and Members of the Legislature of the State of New York in 1859 by William D. Murray (pg. 78ff)

External links

1818 births
1881 deaths
Republican Party New York (state) state senators
Lawyers from Syracuse, New York
New York Supreme Court Justices
Burials at Oakwood Cemetery (Syracuse, New York)
Politicians from Syracuse, New York
19th-century American politicians
19th-century American judges
19th-century American lawyers